Andy Boss (born April 20, 1972) is a former American professional racing driver from Narragansett, Rhode Island. He is the grandson of 1950's Jaguar sportscar driver Russ Boss and younger brother of fellow racer Geoff Boss. Boss retired from active racing in 2004 and joined the A.T. Cross Company.

Racing career

Early career
Like his brother, he began in the Skip Barber Formula Ford Series, driving a Mondial chassis powered by a 1600cc Ford motor. He finished second in the series in 1992 and came back in 1993 to dominate the series with 13 wins in 16 races. His first professional series was the Barber Saab Pro Series in 1993 which he ran concurrently with the 1993 Barber FF Series, finishing 10th (1993) and 4th (1994) in series points in his two years with the league. The 1994 championship came down to four drivers (Boss, Diego Guzman, Mark Hotchkis and Juan Pablo Montoya) at the season finale in Phoenix, with future NASCAR driver Jerry Nadeau winning the race and Columbia's Diego Guzman taking the 1994 series title. In 1994 Boss also teamed with his brother in the 12 Hours of Sebring driving Bob Leitzinger's factory backed Nissan 240SX but the car suffered from mechanical trouble while leading the GTU class. Although the car was repaired, it later retired due to engine failure. In 1995 Boss raced a select number of Barber Dodge pro Series, Vauxhall Lotus (England) and USAC FF2000 races.

Indy Lights
In 1996 he made his Indy Lights debut, driving in the first two races of the season but no other races. He competed in the Barber Dodge Pro Series in 1997, finishing 3rd in the championship with six podium finishes and a victory at Mid-Ohio. He returned to Indy Lights full-time in 1998 with Conquest Racing and had a best finish of 4th at Michigan International Speedway, a race which he momentarily led but finished under caution. In 1999 he moved to LucasPlace Racing but still only had a best finish of 4th, this time at Homestead-Miami Speedway. He drove for LucasPlace again in 2000, but the team was severely underfunded and closed their doors at the end of the season. Along with his professional racing, Boss also competed for several years in the vintage racing series, HSR, driving a 1957 Porsche 356A Speedster.

Complete motorsports results

American Open-Wheel racing results
(key) (Races in bold indicate pole position, races in italics indicate fastest race lap)

Complete USF2000 National Championship results

References

1972 births
Racing drivers from Rhode Island
Indy Lights drivers
Living people
People from Narragansett, Rhode Island
Barber Pro Series drivers
U.S. F2000 National Championship drivers
Conquest Racing drivers